Sultan Abdul Halim Hospital (HSAH), formerly known as Hospital Sungai Petani, is a government-funded public hospital situated in Sungai Petani, Kedah, Malaysia. It is a 498-bed hospital which provides secondary and tertiary specialist services.

The hospital, costing US$150 million, is one of the most high-tech hospitals in northern Peninsular Malaysia with Total Hospital Information System. The Sultan Abdul Halim Hospital was handed over by the Public Works Department to the Health Ministry on 23 July 2006.

The hospital provides laparoscopic gynaecology operations. It is a recognised training center for gynaecologists in this field. It is also a center for thoracic surgery for the northern part of Peninsular Malaysia. This hospital is a training hospital for AIMST University.

The hospital is named after Kedah's former Sultan, Sultan Abdul Halim.

History
The hospital's history dates back to 1920 when the Medical Officer Central Kedah was set up. It was headed by Dr. Richard Brunel Hawes from England. At that time, the hospital was surrounded by rubber estates and jungles with wild animals.

During the Japanese Occupation in 1942, the psychiatric wing was moved to the Bedong Group Estate because the building was used as a Japanese army camp. After the British returned at the end of World War II, the psychiatric wing was shifted back to its original home.

The hospital was then renamed the Sungai Petani District Hospital. At first the hospital did not have any specialists. Specialist services were only started in 1974 with obstetrics and gynaecology as well as internal medicine.

Due to the rapid growth of Sungai Petani district, the need for a new hospital that would keep up with the growing needs of the community became evident. Construction was started on a new 550-bed hospital which would be one of the most up-to-date in Northern Peninsular Malaysia in Amanjaya. The cost of construction was US$150 million. The hospital was handed over by the Public Works Department to the Health Ministry on 23 July 2006.

Specialisations
SAHH currently offers specialist services in 11 fields, as follows:
 Internal medicine
 Thoracic surgery
 Obstetrics and gynaecology
 Orthopaedics
 Anaesthesiology
 Ophthalmology
 Otorhinolaryngology (ENT)
 Radiology
 Pathology
 Paediatrics
 Psychiatry and mental health

The hospital provides laparoscopic gynaecology operations. It is a recognised training center for gynaecologists in this field. It is also a center for thoracic surgery for the northern part of Peninsular Malaysia.

Teaching Hospital
SAHH serves as a teaching hospital for medical students from AIMST University. It is a recognised training center for gynaecologists in the field of laparoscopic gynaecology operations.

References
 Official Webpage
 Hospital probes claim of negligence, The Star, 9 March 2007.
 Malaysian Medical Resource report

2006 establishments in Malaysia
Hospitals in Kedah
Kuala Muda District
Teaching hospitals in Malaysia